Don H. Dwyer Jr. (born February 11, 1958) is an American former politician and former member of the Maryland House of Delegates. He served the 31st District of Anne Arundel County from January 8, 2003 to January 14, 2015. A member of the Republican Party, Dwyer is known for his conservative positions on certain issues, including outspoken opposition to same-sex marriage in Maryland. He was reelected by 25 votes in the November 2006 election and reelected again in 2010. He was defeated in the June, 2014 Republican primary, thought to be largely due to his legal troubles. Since 2017, Dwyer has lived in Clearwater, Florida.  Dwyer chairs the Board of Supervisors for the Clearwater Cay Community Development District.

Alcohol-related legal issues

Dwyer has admitted to drinking on a "pretty regular" basis, beginning at the end of the 2011 legislative session. He has also spoken of attending counseling sessions and Alcoholics Anonymous meetings to cope with alcohol dependency.

On August 22, 2012, Dwyer was operating a motorboat on the Magothy River when he collided with another vessel, seriously injuring himself, John Moran IV, his companion and former police officer, and five others. Among the others injured were three children, including a 5-year-old girl who fractured her skull. Dwyer's blood alcohol content tested three times the legal limit of 0.08. He admitted to operating the boat under the influence at a news conference held outside Maryland Shock Trauma, adding that he regretted his actions. On August 6, 2013, Dwyer pleaded guilty to the charges but appealed his 30-day jail sentence.

While he was appealing, early on the morning of August 20, 2013, Dwyer was pulled over by an Anne Arundel County sheriff's deputy in his 2001 Cadillac DeVille for suspected intoxication. After showing signs of alcohol intoxication, failing field sobriety tests, and refusing a to submit to a breathalyzer examination, he was arrested and transported to the Eastern District for booking.

He was again found guilty and received an additional 30-day sentence for that offense, for a total of 60 days in jail.  He did not resign his seat.

Dwyer claimed his drinking that led to the boat accident was a result of marital problems and feeling betrayed by fellow lawmakers who supported legislation in favor of same-sex marriage in Maryland. Dwyer said "I felt a tremendous amount of pressure in my family. You take those personal issues [and] add betrayal on the professional side, and it really gets to be overwhelming."

Political fundraising

At a May 2013 fundraiser for his political campaign, Rep. Dwyer hosted an auction of assault weapons during a "Gun Rights and Liberty BBQ".

Election results 
2002 General Election for Maryland House of Delegates – District 31
Voters to choose three:
{| class="wikitable"
|-
!Name
!Votes
!Percent
!Outcome
|-
|John R. Leopold, Rep.
|24,937
|  24.31%
|   Won
|-
|Joan Cadden, Dem.
|16,906
|  16.48%
|   Won
|-
|Don Dwyer Jr., Rep.
|16,807
|  16.39%
|   Won
|-
|Thomas R. Gardner, Rep.
|15,321
|  14.94%
|   Lost
|- 
|Mary Rosso, Dem.
|15,127
|  14.75%
|   Lost
|-
|Thomas J. Fleckenstein, Dem.
|13,404
|  13.07%
|   Lost
|-
|Other Write-Ins
|       73
|    0.07%
|
|}

2006 General Election for Maryland House of Delegates – District 31
Voters to choose three:
{| class="wikitable"
|-
!Name
!Votes
!Percent
!Outcome
|- 
|Steve Schuh, Rep.
|19,049
|  18.4%
|   Won
|-
|Nic Kipke, Rep.
|18,150
|  17.5%
|   Won
|-
|Don Dwyer Jr., Rep.
|17,558
|  17.0%
|   Won
|-
|Joan Cadden, Dem.
|17,533
|  16.9%
|   Lost
|-
|Thomas J. Fleckenstein, Dem.
|16,654
|  16.1%
|   Lost
|-
|Craig A. Reynolds, Dem.
|14,454
|  14.0%
|   Lost
|-
|Other Write-Ins
|       58
|    0.1%
|
|}

2010 General Election for Maryland House of Delegates – District 31
Voters to choose three:
{| class="wikitable"
|-
!Name
!Votes
!Percent
!Outcome
|-
|Nic Kipke, Rep.
|24,143
|  21.96%
|   Won
|- 
|Steve Schuh, Rep.
|22,805
|  20.74%
|   Won
|-
|Don Dwyer Jr., Rep.
|22,452
|  20.42%
|   Won
|-
|Jeremiah Chiappelli, Dem.
|12,943
|  11.77%
|   Lost
|-
|Justin M. Towles, Dem.
|11,968
|  10.89%
|   Lost
|-
|Robert L. Eckert, Dem.
|11,856
|  10.78%
|   Lost
|-
|Other Write-Ins
|     105
|    0.1%
|
|}

2014 Republican Primary Election for Maryland House of Delegates – District 31B
Voters to choose two:
{| class="wikitable"
|-
!Name
!Votes
!Percent
!Outcome
|-
|Nic Kipke, Rep.
|3,920
|  31.00%
|   Won
|-
|Meagan Simonaire, Rep.
|3,075
|  24.30%
|   Won
|-
|Gus Kurtz, Rep.
|1,779
|  14.10%
|   Lost
|-
|Brian A. Chisholm, Rep.
|1,607
|  12.70%
|   Lost
|-
|Faith M. Loudon, Rep.
|1,017
|    8.10%
|   Lost
|-
|Don Dwyer, Jr., Rep.
|   890
|    7.00%
|   Lost
|-
|Paul William Drgos, Jr., Rep.
|   230
|    1.80%
|   Lost
|-
|David Lee Therrien, Rep.
|   111
|    0.90%
|   Lost
|}

References

External links
Delegate Don Dwyer (archived from the original on January 11, 2016)
Dwyer biography from the Maryland Archives

Living people
1958 births
Republican Party members of the Maryland House of Delegates
American Presbyterians
Politicians from Annapolis, Maryland
People from Glen Burnie, Maryland
21st-century American politicians
Maryland politicians convicted of crimes